This list is of the Places of Scenic Beauty of Japan located within the Prefecture of Yamanashi.

National Places of Scenic Beauty
As of 1 August 2014, six Places have been designated at a national level (including two *Special Places of Scenic Beauty); Mount Fuji spans the prefectural borders with Shizuoka.

Prefectural Places of Scenic Beauty
As of 1 May 2014, five Places have been designated at a prefectural level.

Municipal Places of Scenic Beauty
As of 1 May 2014, eighteen Places have been designated at a municipal level.

See also
 Cultural Properties of Japan
 List of parks and gardens of Yamanashi Prefecture
 List of Historic Sites of Japan (Yamanashi)

References

External links
  List of Monuments of Japan in Yamanashi Prefecture

Tourist attractions in Yamanashi Prefecture
Places of Scenic Beauty